WHBF refers to the following:

Where Historic Black Hawk Fought, a reference to Chief Black Hawk whose tribe occupied the land that is now Rock Island, Illinois, United States, and the namesake for the WHBF broadcasting stations in Rock Island
WKBF (AM), a defunct radio station (1270 kHz) licensed to Rock Island, Illinois, United States, which held the call sign WHBF from 1925 to 1987
WLKU, an FM radio station (98.9 MHz) licensed to Rock Island, Illinois, United States, which held the call sign WHBF-FM from 1947 to 1987
WHBF-TV, a television station (channel 4 digital/virtual) licensed to Rock Island, Illinois, United States